Jaume Vicens Vives Secondary School (Institut Jaume Vicens Vives in Catalan) is a Spanish state secondary school located in the city of Girona (Spain). It has around 900 pupils from ages 12 to 18 studying for Spanish secondary education qualifications (ESO from 12 to 16, and LOE Baccalaureate from 16 to 18). It was the first state secondary school in Catalonia to offer the International Baccalaureate.

School history

The Spanish Government founded the secondary school in 1845, as part of a major plan to improve access to secondary studies. To enable this, a school was founded in every provincial capital. On 17 September a new secondary school was established in Girona, at the ancient monastery of the Friars Minor Capuchin. With few resources, provided by the provincial government (called Diputació provincial) the school bought important collections in Paris of natural history, botany, chemistry and physics, as well as creating an important library for alumni and, at the same time, for the inhabitants of the city of Girona.

Since 1966 the school has been located in a new building, built in uptown Girona. This modern site was well-furnished for the education requirements of those times. Currently, the school is the leading secondary education centre in the province of Girona, with renovated facilities and some experimental courses, like the IB Diploma Programme since 1999. Also, the Senior Management Team led by Estanislau Puig created the "Institut Jaume Vicens Vives Foundation" (Fundació de l'Institut Jaume Vicens Vives), and a Board of Former Alumni, to support these new experiences.

Currently, the school is fitted with a gymnasium, a library, two computer laboratories, a physics lab, a biology lab and a chemistry lab, as well as two technology workshops, a theater and a farm.

During the COVID-19 pandemic, adjacent spaces such as the Bonavista park and the Muralles park were used as a PE field.

Principals of the school

School song
The school song was composed by Perfecte Moll in 1995 for the celebrations of 150th foundation of the school, with the lyrics by Francesc Amer. On 18 October 2016, the song was sung to mark the celebrations of the 175th foundation of the school.

Aura del sol (The sun's gentle)

Alcem nostres veus sobre la boirada
com aus en l'estela d'un incert futur,
floreixin els cors de nova esperança,
sadolli la terra de vida i de llum...

Com branques novelles
en ferma rabassa
libant les escletxes
de roques i fang,
brandem en les fulles,
verd, guia i mestratge,
l'ànima de pedra
de nous Catalans...!

Som ardent foguera
d'un gresol de joia,
som ànimes netes
en un cant d'amor,
som la Primavera
d'una eterna aurora,
som caliu i cendra
de lluita i esforç.

I en les velles aules
de glòries dormides,
professors i alumnes
aixequem el vol,
parets que reviuen
mil assignatures...:
Som el Vicens Vives,
som l'Aura del Sol…!

References

External links
INS Jaume Vicens Vives Homepage
IB School Details

Secondary schools in Spain
Education in Catalonia
International Baccalaureate schools in Spain
Educational institutions established in 1845
Girona